{{DISPLAYTITLE:C5H8}}

The molecular formula C5H8 may refer to any of the following hydrocarbons:
 Pentynes:
 1-Pentyne
 2-Pentyne
 3-Methyl-1-butyne or isopentyne, CAS 598-23-2

 Pentadienes:
 1,2-Pentadiene, two cis-trans isomers, CAS 591-95-7
 1,3 Pentadiene, CAS 504-60-9 (racemic mixture)
 cis-1,3-Pentadiene or (Z)-1,3-pentadiene, CAS 1574-41-0 
 trans-1,3-Pentadiene or (E)-1,3-pentadiene, or Piperylene
 1,4-Pentadiene, CAS 591-93-5
 2,3-Pentadiene, two axial isomers, CAS 591-96-8 (racemic mixture)
 (Ra)-2,3-Pentadiene, CAS 20431-56-5 
 (Sa)-2,3-Pentadiene, CAS 23190-25-2
 Butadiene derivatives:
 3-Methyl-1,2-butadiene, CAS 598-25-4
 2-Methyl-1,3-butadiene or isoprene

 Cyclopentene

 Cyclobutane derivatives:
 Methylenecyclobutane, CAS 1120-56-5

 Cyclobutene derivatives:
 1-Methylcyclobutene, CAS 1489-60-7
 3-Methylcyclobutene, CAS 1120-55-4 (racemic mixture)
 (R)-3-Methylcyclobutene, CAS 20476-28-2
 (S)-3-Methylcyclobutene, CAS 30334-81-7

 Cyclopropane derivatives:
 Ethenylcyclopropane or Vinylcyclopropane
 Ethylidenecyclopropane, CAS 18631-83-9
 2-Methyl-1-methylenecyclopropane, CAS 18631-84-0 (racemic mixture)
 (R)-2-Methyl-1-methylenecyclopropane
 (S)-2-Methyl-1-methylenecyclopropane

 Cyclopropene derivatives:
 1-Ethylcyclopropene, CAS 34189-00-9
 3-Ethylcyclopropene, CAS 203442-62-0
 1,2-Dimethylcyclopropene, CAS 14309-32-1
 1,3-Dimethylcyclopropene, CAS 82190-83-8 (racemic)
 (R)-1,3-Dimethylcyclopropene
 (S)-1,3-Dimethylcyclopropene
 3,3-Dimethylcyclopropene, CAS 3907-06-0

 Bicyclopentane
 Bicyclo[1.1.1]pentane, CAS 311-75-1
 Bicyclo[2.1.0]pentane or housane, CAS 185-94-4

 Spiro[2.2]pentane or spiropentane, CAS 157-40-4

Functional groups
The formula may also represent a monovalent functional group derived from any hydrocarbon with formula  by removal of one hydrogen atom; or a divalent group derived from  minus two hydrogens; and so on.

See also
 Vinylcyclopropane rearrangement